The women's 1500 metres event at the 2000 World Junior Championships in Athletics was held in Santiago, Chile, at Estadio Nacional Julio Martínez Prádanos on 19 and 21 October.

Medalists

Results

Final
21 October

Heats
19 October

Heat 1

Heat 2

Participation
According to an unofficial count, 29 athletes from 23 countries participated in the event.

References

1500 metres
1500 metres at the World Athletics U20 Championships